Syngrapha altera is a moth of the family Noctuidae. It is found from Newfoundland to Manitoba and Northern Michigan.

The wingspan is 30–34 mm.

Subspecies
There are two recognised subspecies:
Syngrapha altera altera
Syngrapha altera variana (from Maine to Newfoundland)

External links
Syngrapha at funet

Plusiinae
Moths of North America
Moths described in 1902